The Grdelica train bombing occurred on 12 April 1999, when two missiles fired by US aircraft F-15E Strike Eagle hit a passenger train while it was passing across a railway bridge over the Južna Morava river in the Grdelica gorge, some  south of Belgrade,  Serbia. At least 20 civilian passengers were killed or declared missing. Estimates of the total death toll run as high as 60. It is considered the deadliest rail disaster in Serbian history.

The bombing occurred during Operation Allied Force, a NATO operation against the Federal Republic of Yugoslavia (FRY) aimed at forcing the FRY government to end the repression of Albanians in Kosovo and Metohija. The campaign had begun by attacking mainly military targets, but by mid-April the emphasis had changed to strategic and economic targets such as transport links, particularly major bridges.

Events

The bombing occurred at about 11.40 hours local time. An AGM-130 missile precision-guided munition released by a US F-15E Strike Eagle struck the centre of the bridge at the exact moment that the No. 393 passenger train, en route from Belgrade to Ristovac, was crossing the bridge. The missile struck the train, causing major damage, but did not destroy the bridge.

According to General Wesley Clark, who was the Supreme Allied Commander Europe (SACEUR) at the time, the train had been traveling too fast and the bomb was too close to the target for it to divert in time. The first missile had been fired from a significant distance from the target, and the pilot was allegedly not able to recognize the train visually.  Realizing that the train had been hit but believing that he could still complete the mission by striking the end of the bridge where the train had already passed, the pilot then made another pass and fired a second missile. This one too hit the train. Clark described the second hit as an "uncanny accident" in which the train had continued moving into the target area, obscured by dust and smoke from the first strike, stating that the pilot allegedly had had less than one second to react. A gun camera video was released by NATO to support its version of the events. The Pentagon and NATO stated that the error had been the result of the video being speeded up for battle damage assessment purposes, but not being slowed again for the press conference.[13][14]

Controversy

The incident caused an immediate controversy in Serbia and abroad. The Yugoslav state news agency Tanjug released an editorial that accused NATO of performing the attack with the aim of "inflicting suffering on and destroying the Serbian people". In a press conference the day after the attack, General Clark stated that "it was an unfortunate incident which he, and the crew, and all of us very much regret" and "it is one of those regrettable things that happen in a campaign like this and we are all very sorry for it, but we are doing the absolute best we can do to avoid collateral damage." The U.S. Deputy Secretary of Defense, John Hamre, told the United States Congress a few months later that "We never wanted to destroy that train or kill its occupants. We did want to destroy the bridge and we regret this accident."

The German Frankfurter Rundschau prompted a further controversy during January 2000, when it reported that the NATO video had been shown at three times its real speed, giving a misleading impression of the train's speed. The Pentagon and NATO stated that the error had been the result of the video being speeded up for battle damage assessment purposes, but not being slowed again for the press conference. Later investigation by Frankfurter Rundschau asserted that the video was sped up 4.7 times.

Legal issues

The Yugoslav government and some Western groups characterised the attack as a "crime". Other human rights organisations criticised the way that the attack had been continued after the train had been struck by the first strike. Amnesty International argued that the attack should have been stopped when the train had been struck, and that the second bombing had violated the principle of proportionality. In a post-war report, Amnesty stated that the incident

"appears to have violated Article 57 of Protocol I which requires an attack to 'be cancelled or suspended if it becomes clear that the objective is a not a military one ... or that the attack may be expected to cause incidental loss of civilian life... which would be excessive in relation to the concrete and direct military advantage anticipated.' "

The International Criminal Tribunal for the Former Yugoslavia (ICTY) established a committee during May 1999 to determine whether offences against international law had been committed during the NATO campaign. In its final report to the tribunal's Prosecutor, Carla Del Ponte, the committee took the view that the attack had been proportionate:

"It is the opinion of the committee that the bridge was a legitimate military objective. The passenger train was not deliberately targeted. The person controlling the bombs, pilot or WSO, targeted the bridge and, over a very short period of time, failed to recognize the arrival of the train while the first bomb was in flight. The train was on the bridge when the bridge was targeted a second time and the bridge length has been estimated at 50 meters ... It is the opinion of the committee that the information in relation to the attack with the first bomb does not provide a sufficient basis to initiate an investigation."

The committee was divided over the question of whether the aircrew had behaved recklessly. It recommended nonetheless "that the attack on the train at Grdelica Gorge should not be investigated by the [Prosecutor]." A.P.V. Rogers comments that the committee "must have considered the first missile strike to be a legitimate action against a military objective, the inference being that any civilian casualties of that strike were not disproportionate, and that the firing of the second missile was an error of judgment in the heat of the moment."

List of killed passengers

 Zoran Jovanović (35) from Niš
 Petar (46) and Verka (47) Mladenović, family from Niš
 Ana (25) and Ivan Marković (26), family from Leskovac
 Jasmina Veljković (28) from Stalać
 Vidosav (45), Divna (41) and son Branimir (5) Stanijanović, family from Prćilovica 
 Simeon Todorov (31) from Stalać
 Svetomir Petković (64) from Aleksinac
 Radomir Jovanović (45) from Niš

Other victims couldn't be identified.

Aftermath

The damaged bridge was repaired and reopened during September 1999. On 12 April 2007 a ceremony was performed at the site to mourn the victims on the occasion of the eighth anniversary of the bombing.

See also 

 Varvarin bridge bombing
Lužane bus bombing
 Koriša bombing
 NATO bombing of Albanian refugees near Gjakova

References 

Aerial operations and battles of the Kosovo War
Railway accidents and incidents in Serbia
1999 in Serbia
Railway accidents in 1999
Leskovac
NATO airstrikes
Civilian casualties in the Kosovo War
Incidents involving NATO
April 1999 events in Europe
United States military scandals
United States war crimes
1999 disasters in Serbia